Rosaire Longelo-Mbule (born 20 October 1999) is an English professional footballer who plays for Accrington Stanley as a defender.

Career
After playing for West Ham United and Newcastle United, Longelo signed with Accrington Stanley in January 2022.

Personal life
Longelo was born in Kinshasa in the Democratic Republic of the Congo, before moving to England as a child. Longelo played alongside his brother, Emmanuel, in West Ham's academy.

Career statistics

References

1999 births
Living people
English footballers
West Ham United F.C. players
Newcastle United F.C. players
Accrington Stanley F.C. players
English Football League players
Association football defenders
English sportspeople of Democratic Republic of the Congo descent
Black British sportspeople
Democratic Republic of the Congo emigrants to England
Footballers from Kinshasa